Hannu Tapio Hoskonen (born 23 August 1957 in Ilomantsi) is a Finnish politician currently serving in the Parliament of Finland for the Centre Party at the Savonia-Karelia constituency.

References

1957 births
Living people
People from Ilomantsi
Members of the Orthodox Church of Finland
Centre Party (Finland) politicians
Members of the Parliament of Finland (2003–07)
Members of the Parliament of Finland (2007–11)
Members of the Parliament of Finland (2015–19)
Members of the Parliament of Finland (2019–23)